Fabrizio Cammarata (born 30 August 1975) is an Italian football manager who is assistant head coach of Melbourne Victory.

Career

Playing career

Cammarata started his career with Italian Serie A side Juventus. In 1994, Cammarata signed for Verona in the Italian second division, where he made 65 league appearances and scored 18 goals, helping them earn promotion to the Italian top flight. Before the second half of 2003-04, he signed for Italian Serie A club Parma. In 2004, Cammarata signed for Catanzaro in the Italian second division. In 2006, he signed for Italian third division team Taranto. In 2010, he signed for RC Angolana in the Italian fourth division. In 2011, Cammarata signed for Italian fifth division outfit Sulmona.

Managerial career

He started coaching in 2012 in Sulmona and then a few months later he started coaching in the Pescara youth until 2016. In 2017, he was appointed youth manager of Akhmat in Russia. In 2019, he was appointed manager of Albanian second division side Dinamo Tirana. In 2021, Cammarata was appointed manager of Apolonia in the Albanian top flight. In 2021, he was appointed assistant manager of Australian club Melbourne Victory. in February 2022 he participated in the victory of the FFA Cup

References

External links
 

Italian footballers
Living people
Association football forwards
1975 births
Italian football managers
Italian expatriate football managers
Expatriate football managers in Russia
Italian expatriate sportspeople in Russia
Expatriate football managers in Albania
Italian expatriate sportspeople in Albania
Expatriate soccer managers in Australia
Italian expatriate sportspeople in Australia
People from Caltanissetta
Hellas Verona F.C. players
Torino F.C. players
Delfino Pescara 1936 players
Cagliari Calcio players
Parma Calcio 1913 players
U.S. Catanzaro 1929 players
Taranto F.C. 1927 players
U.S. Salernitana 1919 players
Aurora Pro Patria 1919 players
Vastese Calcio 1902 players
FK Dinamo Tirana managers
KF Apolonia Fier managers
Sportspeople from the Province of Caltanissetta
Footballers from Sicily